Sloan Park is an American baseball park in Mesa, Arizona, which opened in 2014.  The primary operator is the Chicago Cubs and the ballpark serves as their spring training home and is also the home of the Arizona League Cubs of the Arizona League and the Mesa Solar Sox of the Arizona Fall League. Sloan Park was built and paid for by residents of the City of Mesa, approved by ballot measure. It was primarily built to house spring training operations for the Chicago Cubs, who had previously played at nearby Hohokam Stadium. The stadium design was led by Populous. The dimensions of the playing surface closely match those of the Cubs' regular home stadium, Wrigley Field. There are many secondary fields at the park, most of which are training and practice fields.

With a capacity of 15,000, Sloan Park is the largest spring training stadium by capacity in Major League Baseball, surpassing Camelback Ranch in Glendale (coincidentally, spring training home of the Cubs' in-city rival the Chicago White Sox) by 2,000 seats.

Formerly known as Cubs Park, on January 8, 2015, it was announced that Sloan Valve Company had signed a naming-rights deal to the ballpark, giving it its current Sloan Park name.
The stadium is currently the newest stadium in the Cactus League. While it is home to these spring training games, it has also hosted some youth tournaments.

See also
 Mesa Riverview

References

External links
 Venue website

Cactus League venues
Minor league baseball venues
Sports venues in Maricopa County, Arizona
Chicago Cubs spring training venues
Baseball venues in Arizona
Sports in Mesa, Arizona
2014 establishments in Arizona
Sports venues completed in 2014
Arizona Complex League ballparks
Arizona Fall League ballparks